The Basque derby (in Basque Euskal Derbia, in Spanish derbi Vasco) is the name of the football local derby between Real Sociedad and Athletic Bilbao. It embodies the inter-city rivalry between Bilbao and Donostia-San Sebastián, capitals of the neighbouring provinces of Gipuzkoa and Biscay (Bizkaia) in the Basque Country region of Spain. It is also occasionally referred to as the AP-8 derby, referring to the name of the highway which connects the cities.

Background
The derby was first played in April 1909 and has attracted the attention of local football fans ever since. These two organisations are the largest football clubs in the Basque Country and have stayed in the top division of Spanish football for longer than most clubs, winning several trophies in the last hundred years. Both enjoyed a period of great success in the early 1980s, winning four national titles in succession between them, whilst using only local players.

Other clubs in the territory have also competed in the top division (and opposed Real Sociedad occasionally in the second tier, in addition to cup ties), with CA Osasuna, Deportivo Alavés, and SD Eibar the most prominent of these; the matches between any of them are also referred to as a “Basque derby”.

Supporters of both teams traditionally mix in and around the stadiums on matchdays, somewhat unusually for a local derby, and take part in organised accompanying events such as a 'kalijera' (a supporters' parade from the city centre to the stadium) and the 'Bertso-derbia', a singing and poetry contest between the two groups in the style of the traditional Bertsolaritza. The fans have received praise for the relaxed atmosphere which usually accompanies the derby matches, and although incidents have occurred within the stadia, the hostility is usually directed towards rival players rather than fans.

Real Sociedad has played in the second division for some short periods of its history (16 seasons, the longest spell being five years) and for that reason the derby has not always been contested every season. Athletic Bilbao has never been relegated, meaning all their league matches have taken place in the top tier. In the 21st century, there has only been one enforced break in the fixtures, a three-year (1400 days) hiatus between January 2007 and December 2010.

History

1900s cups

The first meeting between Athletic Bilbao and a team which evolved into Real Sociedad should have taken place in the 1905 Copa del Rey, which consisted of a mini-league with just three teams: Athletic, hosts Madrid F.C. and San Sebastián Recreation Club. After Madrid defeated both Basque teams, Athletic declined to play the dead rubber between them. Despite this withdrawal, however, the federation considers Athletic to be the runners-up in the tournament as it was their match with Madrid which confirmed the latter as the winners.

By the 1909 event, the Recreation Club had evolved into San Sebastián Foot-Ball Club but aligned with Club Ciclista de San Sebastián to meet the entry requirements. They defeated Athletic in the opening round and went on to win the trophy.

The following year, the club was renamed Sociedad de Foot-Ball de San Sebastián and had received royal patronage, entitling it to add the prefix Real. However a dispute occurred over the entitlement of Real Sociedad to claim the honour of champions, and two separate competitions were held (both of which were later declared official, meaning there are two 1910 winners). Although Real Sociedad hosted their version of the competition at their Ondarreta ground, once again they did not meet the requisite statutes and their players joined with another club to participate, this time Vasconia Sporting Club. Once more it was a three-team league involving Athletic Bilbao and Madrid, with Athletic winning both of their matches to win the cup, with the decisive win being over Vasconia who are thus listed as runners-up (and in any case they beat Madrid to confirm that status).

In the 1911 Copa del Rey, Real Sociedad withdrew in protest after their accusations that other teams, primarily Athletic Bilbao, were using ineligible foreign players, were rejected. Athletic went on to win the trophy without using the disputed players, although they did use some from Atlético Madrid which at that time was a branch of the older Bilbao club. This led to the Royal Spanish Football Federation introducing a rule for the next year's competition that all players must be Spanish citizens. Athletic chose to maintain the approach of using only local Basque players even when the regulations were relaxed some years later, a tradition which has continued into the 21st century. Real had a similar policy from the late 1960s, but it was dropped for foreign imports in 1989 when they signed the Republic of Ireland forward John Aldridge, and for non-Basque Spanish players in 2002 with the transfer of Boris from Real Oviedo.

Regional leagues

In October 1913, a friendly was held between the two teams to inaugurate Real Sociedad's Atotxa Stadium; the result was a 3–3 draw and the first goalscorer at the stadium was Pichichi, Athletic's legendary forward of the age who had also been the first scorer in the opening match at Athletic Bilbao's own new ground, San Mames, two months earlier. In the same year, regional league competitions were introduced to the area to determine the qualifying teams for the Copa del Rey. In the first three seasons, Athletic Bilbao and Real Sociedad were in the same competition, but due to repeated disputes by the rival provinces, these separated into the Biscay Championship – dominated by Athletic and Arenas Club de Getxo – and the Gipuzkoa Championship – usually won by Real Sociedad or Real Unión – which ran in parallel for sixteen years.

In 1934 the top six clubs in the region, including Athletic and Real (then known as Donostia FC under the Second Spanish Republic which rejected regal names), were involved in the Basque Cup which ran until 1936 when the Spanish Civil War brought an end to organised football for three years. At the end of the conflict, the regional championships were re-instated for two further seasons, with Atlético de Bilbao (another renaming, this time an order of Franco's regime prohibiting non-Spanish words that lasted until the 1970s) and Real Sociedad kept apart. By then, the national league was well established, with the clubs' first meeting in that competition occurring in February 1929.

In 1969, the rare possibility of a Basque cup final was ended when Elche defeated Real Sociedad in the semi-finals before losing to Athletic Bilbao in Madrid. This was a repeat of the events of the 1958 competition when Real Madrid beat Real Sociedad but lost to Athletic, while in 1965 both Basque clubs had been eliminated in the semi-finals.

Later history

Both clubs are proud of their Basque identity; in addition to employing a cantera system for developing local players, in 1976 their captains Inaxio Kortabarria and José Ángel Iribar famously led the teams onto the field displaying the banned Ikurriña (Basque flag) following the death of General Franco. Real Sociedad proved far superior on the pitch that day, winning 5–0, their biggest-ever derby victory up to that point (they eventually matched it in 1995).

Although Real Sociedad nowadays select foreign players, both clubs usually incorporate the Ikurriña on their kit and the captains' armbands invariably feature the flag, while mutual displays by the players, such as support for an official Basque Country national team, are often seen.

In October 1970 the clubs had met in a friendly to mark the installation of floodlights at SD Eibar's stadium, Ipurua, won by Athletic on a penalty shootout after a 1–1 draw. In competitive games, penalties would become a fairly common feature of cup ties with three taking place in consecutive meetings (1975, 1982, 1984), two of which were also won by Athletic.

In terms of results sequences in the league, Real Sociedad hold two accolades: longest unbeaten league run of 15 matches, 1993 to 2000 (Athletic's best is 11, 1958 to 1968) and consecutive home wins with 14, between 1969 and 1982 (Athletic achieved 5 between 2002 and 2005). Athletic hold the record for consecutive league victories in either city, with a fairly modest seven wins spanning either side of the Civil War (1934 to 1944).

Although both clubs have been fairly successful at various points in their history, only five derby matches have taken place with both clubs placed in the top five league positions at the time: 1979–80, 1981–82 (when Real Sociedad won the title with a derby win on the final day), 1987–88, 1997–98 and 2013–14.

In 2016, an annual friendly match was established incorporating the results of the Basque derby, as well as other league fixtures between teams in the region, with the two clubs holding the best records being invited to play in the 'final' prior to the start of the following season. Although Real Sociedad finished 6th in 2016–17, the highest among Basque teams, their record against their neighbours was inferior to those of Athletic Bilbao and Alavés (the match between them in Barakaldo was not completed due to indiscipline among the players). The second edition did feature Athletic v Real, with the Bilbao team winning 1–0 in Irun. The third was won by Eibar over Real Sociedad, who finally took the title at the fourth attempt in 2020 by beating Osasuna.

Copa del Rey final
Both teams qualified for the 2020 Copa del Rey Final, the first ever Basque derby showdown (disregarding the mini-league involving Athletic and Vasconia in 1910). Originally scheduled for 18 April, the fixture was postponed due to the escalating COVID-19 pandemic in Spain which had led to other matches being cancelled or played in an empty stadium, something the clubs wished to avoid, particularly given the significance of the match. It was eventually played – in an empty stadium – 350 days after its original date, on 3 April 2021. In a tense match featuring several players with ties to the opposition, and which produced many fouls and few chances, Mikel Oyarzabal scored the only goal – from a penalty – to give Real Sociedad a historic victory and their first major trophy since 1987.

Players and coaches with both clubs

Several players have played for both clubs, such as Loren Juarros, Joseba Etxeberria and Iban Zubiaurre whose direct transfers from Real to Athletic caused deep resentment and a cooling of the fraternal relationship between the clubs (and in the case of the latter, a lawsuit regarding the legality of the deal). By contrast, Bittor Alkiza's move was better received, and he later returned to San Sebastián. Others who made the move, almost all from Real to Athletic, include Luciano Iturrino, David Billabona, Andoni Imaz, Igor Gabilondo, Iñigo Díaz de Cerio, Xabier Castillo, Gorka Elustondo and Mikel Balenziaga.

In January 2018, Iñigo Martínez made the same move, with his transfer only made possible by Athletic paying his €32 million contractual release clause amount, making it impossible for Real Sociedad to reject the approach. In turn, the buying club only had the sufficient financial means due to receiving approximately double that amount the same day for Aymeric Laporte who moved to Manchester City, also via his release clause. Real Sociedad's response to the defection of Martínez – who had previously been quoted as saying he would never move to Athletic Bilbao – was to offer a new replica jersey to all supporters who presented an older one with his name on the back at the club shops, with the process titled 'He's history'. In addition to being the most expensive move between two Basque clubs, the Martínez fee was the new record for spending by Athletic (the Laporte deal became the record amount received by them); Real Sociedad had received slightly more in 2013 when Asier Illarramendi transferred to Real Madrid.

Eight coaches have been in charge of both clubs, including Rafael Iriondo, José María Amorrortu, Javier Irureta and Javier Clemente who are better known for their spells with Athletic Bilbao, whereas Salvador Artigas had a more significant association with the Txuriurdin; the others are Lippo Hertzka, Antonio Barrios and Baltasar Albéniz.

Scoring records

The top scorers in the fixture are Athletic's Zarra and Real's Jesús María Satrústegui, both on 14, with Zarra's all scored in the league and Satrus with 13 in the league and one in the cup. Dani has 13, with nine of those in the league.

Zarra is the player with the most goals scored in a match, netting five times in his team's 7–1 victory in 1951. Athletic had previously achieved a 7–1 (in San Sebastián) in 1930, and won 6–1 in the match in Bilbao later that same year. However, their record margin of victory was 7–0 in 1935, with Bata getting three. Real's player scoring record in a single match was 3 goals, set by George McGuinness in their first-ever cup tie in 1909, later matched in the league in 1932 by Cholín and in 1995 by Meho Kodro, whose hat-trick in the 5–0 home win contributed to his transfer to FC Barcelona at the end of that season, giving him no further opportunity to add to his derby goals tally. In a twist of irony for the derby, Meho's son Kenan later played for Athletic.

Statistics

Notes

List of official matches

La Liga

Notes

Copa del Rey

Notes

Copa de la Liga

Champions tournament (1927)

North championship (1914–18)

Basque Cup (1934–36)

Comparative league placings

• Total: Athletic Bilbao with 69 higher finishes, Real Sociedad with 22 higher finishes (as of the end of the 2021–22 season).

Top goalscorers

Women's Basque derby 

Athletic Bilbao established their women's team in 2002, with that of Real Sociedad founded two years later and reaching the top tier in 2006. While Athletic have won the national league title on five occasions, Real have yet to be champions, although they have never been relegated from the top division and in 2019 were winners of the Copa de la Reina, which Athletic had never been able to do.

In February 2019, a Basque derby league fixture hosted by Real Sociedad, which would usually be held at the club's Zubieta training centre, was played at the Anoeta Stadium, attracting an attendance of 21,234 (the result was a 2–2 draw). This attendance record was beaten in October 2019, at the same stadium, for a 2–0 Athletic away win watched by 28,367 spectators.

See also 
 Basque football derbies

References

External links
Basque Derby at Marca.com

Athletic Bilbao
Real Sociedad
Football rivalries in Spain
Football in the Basque Country (autonomous community)
Sport in San Sebastián
Sport in Bilbao
Recurring sporting events established in 1909